Bit (Khabit, Bid, Psing, Buxing) is an Austroasiatic language spoken by around 2,000 people in Phongsaly Province, northern Laos and in Mengla County, Yunnan, China.

Names
In China, the Buxing people (布兴, 布幸, or 布醒;) are also called Kami (佧米人) or Kabi (佧比人,).

Yan & Zhou (2012:157) list the following names for Khabit.
,  (autonyms)
 (Dai exonym)
 (Khmu exonym)
Kami (卡咪, Chinese exonym)

The Khabit name for Khmu is ta mɔi.

Classification
Paul Sidwell (2014) and Svantesson (1990) classify Bit as Palaungic. It is most closely related to Kháng and Quang Lam.

Distribution

Laos
In Laos, Bit is spoken by 2,000 people in the following villages. The speakers call themselves "Laubit".

Nam Lie
Nam Lan
Nam Liaŋ
Nam Pauk
Bɔn Tsɛm Mɑi
Nam Tha
Bɔn Hui Huo
Bɔn Bɔm Phiŋ
Nam Nɔi

Kingsada (1999) covers the Khabit (khaa bet) language of Nale village, Bun Neua District, Phongsaly Province, Laos.

China
In Mengla County, Yunnan, China, Bit (Buxing) is spoken by 539 people as of 2000, in the following villages.

Nanqian (南欠村), Manzhuang Village (曼庄村), Mohan Township (磨憨镇)
Kami (卡咪村), Huiluo Village (回洛村), Kami Township (卡米镇) / Mengban (勐伴镇)

In Menghai County, Yunnan, China, there is a group of people known as the Bajia (八甲人) of Menghun (勐混), not to be confused with the Tai-speaking Bajia of Meng'a Township (勐阿镇), Menghai County), which is close to the border with Shan State, Myanmar. They live in Manbi Village (曼必村), Menghun Town (勐混镇), Menghai County, Yunnan (comprising 48 households and 217 persons), and have recently been classified by the Chinese government as ethnic Bulang people. Their autonym is Manbi (曼必) or Bi (必). The Bajia of Menghun believe that their ancestors had migrated from Laos. They are variously referred to by other ethnic groups as Kabi (卡必), Laos Bulang (老挝布朗), and Manbi people (曼必人). They do not consider themselves to be Bajia (八甲人), which is a name given to them by government officials, since they do not believe they are related to the Tai-speaking Bajia of Meng'a. Yunnan (1979) considers Bajia (八甲) to be a dialect of Tai Lue based on the group's autonym and language, with 225 Bajia people counted as of 1960. The Bajia had originally migrated from Bajia 八甲, Laojian Mountain 老肩山, Jinggu County. Yunnan (1979) documents the location of Bajia as Jingbo Township (景播乡), Meng'a District (勐阿区), Menghai County.

Yunnan (1979) reports that in Mengla County, the Khabit (Kabie, 卡别) have close relations with a group called the Bubeng (布崩), who numbered 15 households with about 100 people as of 1960, and speak a Hani language. Yunnan (1979) classifies both the Kabie (卡别) and Bubeng (布崩) as ethnic Hani people.

References

Further reading

External links 
 RWAAI (Repository and Workspace for Austroasiatic Intangible Heritage)
 http://hdl.handle.net/10050/00-0000-0000-0003-9381-D@view (Bit in RWAAI Digital Archive)

Languages of Laos
Languages of China
Palaungic languages
Khmuic languages